John Needham Huggard Brennan (1914–2010) was an Irish author, hunter, and solicitor. He published under the name John Welcome. He adopted the pen name due to the then-strict laws concerning advertising by solicitors.

References

External links
 Irish Independent obituary

1914 births
2010 deaths
Irish solicitors
Irish writers